Bishop McDevitt High School was a private, comprehensive, co-educational Roman Catholic high school in the Wyncote community in Cheltenham Township, Pennsylvania, United States. It was located in the Roman Catholic Archdiocese of Philadelphia.

Background
The school served grades nine through twelve with a diverse mix of students with an academic program grounded in the teachings and formations of the Catholic faith.

It was accredited by the Pennsylvania Department of Education, the Middle States Association of Colleges and Schools, and the Archdiocese of Philadelphia.

The faculty consisted of lay and religious men and women, the majority of whom held advanced degrees in their area of specialization.

History
Bishop McDevitt High School was dedicated on December 8, 1958, and opened to students the following day. The school celebrated its first graduating class in June 1961. The school added vocational and technical education in 1965; won Philadelphia Catholic League marching band title in 1965; won its first boys' Philadelphia Catholic League title in 1966; became co-educational shortly after it first opened Ed; won its first girls' Philadelphia Catholic League title in 1979; welcomed its first lay principal in 1985; opened its first computer lab in 1987; achieved its Middle States accreditation in 1988; started a Development Office and Alumni Association in 1989; and moved into open enrollment and a restructured president and principal model of administration in 1993.

The school was closed in 2020, effective at the end of the school year in 2021.

Notable alumni 
Frank Rizzo Jr. - member of Philadelphia City Council
Paul F. Tompkins '86 - American comedian, actor and writer
Chris Conlin - All-American football player at the Pennsylvania State University, NFL player with the Miami Dolphins
Cindy Griffin '87 - women's head basketball coach at St. Joseph's University
Jim Curtin '97 - is a retired American soccer player and currently the head coach for the Philadelphia Union

Notes and references

External links
 School website

Catholic secondary schools in Pennsylvania
Educational institutions established in 1958
Schools in Montgomery County, Pennsylvania
1958 establishments in Pennsylvania
Cheltenham Township, Pennsylvania